Martha J. Somerman (*March 13, 1947 in Brooklyn, NY, USA) is an internationally known researcher and educator in Medicine, focusing on defining the key regulators controlling development, maintenance, and regeneration of dental, oral, and craniofacial tissues.  She is currently (updated Nov 06, 2019) Chief Lab of Laboratory of Oral Connective Tissue Biology (LOCTB) at NIH's National Institute of Arthritis and Musculoskeletal and Skin Diseases (NIAMS) and Director of the National Institute of Dental and Craniofacial Research (NIDCR), a part of the National Institutes of Health (NIH) located in Bethesda, Maryland, USA.

Early life and education
Martha J. Somerman was born on March 13, 1947, in Brooklyn, N.Y., U.S.A. Martha Somerman gained a Bachelor of Arts (BA) from New York University, Master of Science (MS) from Hunter College, Doctor of Dental Surgery (DDS) from New York University, and a PhD from the University of Rochester.

Research and Career 

Her career at the University of Michigan started in 1991. She was Associate Professor and Chair for the Department of Periodontics/Prevention/Geriatrics (PPG) at the Michigan Dental School and Associate Professor for the Department of Pharmacology at the Michigan Medical School until 1995. Afterwards she became Professor and Chair of the PPG Department and Professor for the Department of Pharmacology until 2000. She was then Associate Dean of the School of Dentistry at the University of Washington, a position she held for two years and became Dean in 2002. In 2011, she was appointed the director of the National Institute of Dental and Craniofacial Research (NIDCR). She succeeded acting director Isabel Garcia.

Somerman has more than 190 peer-review publications with over 8,000 citations and she has contributed to 20 books or book chapters.

Awards and honors 
She has received numerous honors and awards throughout her academic career.

 2010 she got the IADR/PRG Award in Regenerative Periodontal Medicine. 
 In 2011, Harvard University awarded Martha Somerman the AADR's Paul Goldhaber Award, which is presented annually to "an individual who is held in the highest international esteem in his or her field relating to oral and systemic health", acknowledging her work in the field of the regeneration of hard and soft tissues. 
 Most recently in 2018, she got awarded from the International Association for Dental Research's (IADR) Distinguished Scientist Award for Basic Research in Biological Mineralization.

See also 

 Women in dentistry in the United States

References

Living people
National Institutes of Health
1947 births
University of Michigan faculty
NIH Women Scientists Project
New York University College of Dentistry alumni
Hunter College alumni
University of Rochester alumni
American scientists
American women scientists
American women academics
21st-century American women